William Franklin "Bill" Baker (born September 20, 1942) is an American broadcaster, executive, author, public speaker, academic, and explorer.

Dr. Baker directs the Bernard L. Schwartz Center for Media, Education, and Public Policy at Fordham University, where he is also Journalist-in-Residence and a professor in the Graduate School of Education. He is also the Distinguished Professor of media & entertainment at IESE Business School, Barcelona, Spain, and President Emeritus of WNET, New York's public television station.  He teaches a business class at the Juilliard School in New York City.

Career 
In 1972 while with WEWS in Cleveland, Ohio, Baker along with the station's general manager Don Perris created The Morning Exchange, an easygoing morning show program offering news and weather updates only at the top and bottom of every hour and used the rest of the time to discuss general-interest/entertainment topics. The Morning Exchange also established a group of regular guests who were experts in certain fields, including health, entertainment, consumer affairs and travel. It's laidback approach featured a set resembling a suburban living room rather than the newsroom approach all news programs were using. The Morning Exchange became one of the most successful local television programs in US history and served as the template for ABC's Good Morning America and changed the face of morning television.

During his 21-year tenure as president of WNET in New York, America's flagship public broadcaster, Baker fortified its existence with the development of one of the first — and then largest — endowments in the history of public broadcasting, and presided over its heyday as the pre-eminent producer of arts, nature, biography and public affairs programming in the nation.

Baker was president of Westinghouse Broadcasting and chairman of their cable and programming companies. At Westinghouse, Baker introduced Oprah Winfrey as a talk show host and established PM Magazine as the #1 syndicated program in America in the 1980s. Baker was involved with the early stages of launching both the Discovery Channel and the Disney Channel.

Baker established WNET's Educational Resources Center, the nation's most prolific trainer in multimedia teaching techniques.  He also founded the Bernard L. Schwartz Center for Media, Education, & Public Policy at Fordham University, and was an annual speaker at WNET's Celebration of Teaching and Learning.

Publications and productions 
Baker is co-author of the books The World's Your Stage: How Performing Artists Can Make a Living While Still Doing What They Love(Amacom, 2016) based on a class he teaches at The Juilliard School and Fordham University, Every Leader is an Artist and Leading with Kindness: How Good People Consistently Get Superior Results. Baker is also the co-author of  Down the Tube: An Insider’s Account of the Failure of American Television and the author of Lighthouse Island: Our Family Escape.

Baker is the executive producer of The Face: Jesus in Art, a landmark Emmy-winning feature film that traces the image of Jesus Christ in art around the world and across two millennia. He is also executive producer of the film Sacred, which depicts sites and rituals from the sacred calendar of a diversity of world religions. Sacred was released worldwide in theaters and festivals in 2017. Baker also hosted the 2008 PBS documentary Leading with Kindness.

Awards 
Baker is the recipient of seven Emmy Awards and is a fellow of the American Academy of Arts and Sciences.  He has been inducted into the National Academy of Television Arts & Sciences (NATAS) Management Hall of Fame and received the Mark Schubart award from the Lincoln Center Institute, given to individuals who most exemplify the Institute's ideal of integrating the arts with education.  He has also been inducted into the Broadcasting & Cable Hall of Fame and the New York State Broadcasters Association Hall of Fame. Baker is also the recipient of two Columbia DuPont Journalism Awards, and honored in 2016 by the Chamber Music Society of Lincoln Center for his work in the performing arts.

Baker has also received the Gabriel Personal Achievement Award, two Alfred I. duPont–Columbia University Award and the 1987 Trustees Emmy Award, given in recognition of outstanding contribution to the advancement of television.

Baker has received seven honorary doctorates from universities in America and Europe

Personal 
Baker holds a B.A., M.A. and Ph.D. in Communications Sciences and Organizational Behavior from Case Western Reserve University, and nine honorary doctorates. 
Baker is a former Chairman of the National Parks System Advisory Board, and serves on the board of Rodale, Inc. in Emmaus, Pennsylvania.  In cooperation with Fordham University, he teaches The Business of the Performing Arts, Juilliard's only business course.

Baker is believed to be the eighth person in history to have stood on both the North Pole and the South Pole.

References

External links
 http://schwartzcenterny.org

1942 births
Living people
American chief executives in the media industry
American television executives
Case Western Reserve University alumni
Fellows of the American Academy of Arts and Sciences
Fordham University faculty